VII. Kerületi Sport Club was a Hungarian association football club from the town of Budapest. The club was founded as Festőmunkások Labdarúgó Egylete in 1913. In 1923 the club merged to Zuglói AC.

History
Zuglói VII. Kerületi Sport Club debuted in the 1920–21 season of the Hungarian League and finished sixth. In the 1921–22 season the club finished the 12th place and dropped to the II league.

Name Changes 
1913–1918: Festőmunkások Labdarúgó Egylete
1918–1923: VII. Kerületi Sport Club
1923: merger with Zuglói Atlétikai Club

Managers

References

External links
 Profile

Football clubs in Hungary
1913 establishments in Hungary